We Travel the Space Ways is an album by the American jazz musician Sun Ra and his Myth Science Arkestra. Recorded mostly in 1960, the album was released in 1967, on Sun Ra's own label Saturn. The album brings together a number of eras and personnel of the Arkestra, and was probably mostly recorded by Ra himself during rehearsals.

The earliest recording, New Horizons, was recorded at Balkan Studio, Chicago, April 13, 1956, and predates the version on Jazz by Sun Ra. Velvet was recorded at the end of the session at RCA Studios, Chicago, around June 17, 1960, that yielded over 30 recordings spread across 5 albums (Fate In A Pleasant Mood, Holiday for Soul Dance, Angels and Demons at Play, We Travel the Space Ways & Interstellar Low Ways). Eve and Space Loneliness were recorded at the Pershing Lounge, Chicago, July 13, 1961. The rest were recorded at various rehearsals in 1960. The mechanical sound at the end of the title track comes from a toy robot: 
"The bizarre whirring and quacking heard at the end of “We Travel the Spaceways” comes from a toy robot with flashing lights; John Gilmore told John Corbett that around this time the Arkestra would release the “robots” into the audience during their performances. The band also used mechanical “flying saucers” as props".

When the album was re-issued on CD by Evidence, it was coupled with the whole of the 1961 album Bad & Beautiful, Ra's first recording for Saturn after arriving in New York.

Track listing

12" Vinyl
All songs were written by Sun Ra.
Side A:
"Interplanetary Music" - (2.41)
"Eve" - (3.08)
"We Travel the Space Ways" - (3.23)
"Tapestry from an Asteroid" - (2.07)
Side B:
"Space Loneliness" - (4.49)
"New Horizons" - (3.01)
"Velvet" - (4.36)

The album includes a number of alternative versions of songs that also appear - usually in better quality recordings - on other early Saturn albums; Interplanetary Music and Space Loneliness appear on Interstellar Low Ways; Eve is also on Sun Ra and his Solar Arkestra Visits Planet Earth; We Travel The Space Ways from When Sun Comes Out; ; Tapestry From An Asteroid from The Futuristic Sounds of Sun Ra on Savoy Records; New Horizons from Jazz by Sun Ra; & Velvet which appears on Jazz In Silhouette. All of these records had already been released by the time We Travel the Space Ways was produced.

Musicians
Sun Ra
Phil Cohran
Marshall Allen
George Hudson
John Gilmore
William Strickland
Art Hoyle
Julian Priester
James Scales
Wilburn Green
Pat Patrick
Ronnie Boykins
Robert Barry
Jon Hardy
William Cochran

See also 

Sun Ra Discography

References

 Complete Sun Ra's Discography

Sun Ra albums
1961 albums
El Saturn Records albums
Evidence Music albums